Sulfosalt minerals are sulfide minerals with the general formula , where
A represents a metal such as copper, lead, silver, iron, and rarely mercury, zinc, vanadium
B usually represents semi-metal such as arsenic, antimony, bismuth, and rarely germanium, or metals like tin and rarely vanadium
X is sulfur or rarely selenium and/or tellurium.

The Strunz classification includes the sulfosalts in a sulfides and sulfosalts superclass. A group which have similar appearing formulas are the sulfarsenides (for example cobaltite (Co,Fe)AsS). In sulfarsenides the arsenic substitutes for sulfide anions whereas in the sulfosalts the arsenic substitutes for a metal cation.

About 200 sulfosalt minerals are known. Examples include:

 type
Pyrargyrite 
Proustite 
Tetrahedrite 
Tennantite 
 type
Enargite 
Sulvanite 
Samsonite 
Geocronite 
Gratonite 
 type
Bournonite 
Seligmannite 
Aikinite 
 type
Boulangerite 
Matildite 
Smithite 
Chalcostibite 
Emplectite 
Teallite 
 type
Ramdohrite 
Jamesonite 
Cosalite 
 type
Andorite 
Lindstromite 
 type
Zinkenite 
Berthierite 
Cylindrite

Nickel–Strunz Classification -02- Sulfosalts 
IMA-CNMNC proposes a new hierarchical scheme (Mills et al., 2009). This list uses the Classification of Nickel–Strunz (mindat.org, 10 ed, pending publication).

Abbreviations:
"*" - discredited (IMA/CNMNC status).
"?" - questionable/doubtful (IMA/CNMNC status).
"REE" - Rare-earth element (Sc, Y, La, Ce, Pr, Nd, Pm, Sm, Eu, Gd, Tb, Dy, Ho, Er, Tm, Yb, Lu)
"PGE" - Platinum-group element (Ru, Rh, Pd, Os, Ir, Pt)
03.C Aluminofluorides, 06 Borates, 08 Vanadates (04.H V[5,6] Vanadates), 09 Silicates:
Neso: insular (from Greek νῆσος nēsos, island)
Soro: grouping (from Greek σωρός sōros, heap, mound (especially of corn))
Cyclo: ring (from Greek κύκλος kyklos, wheel, ring, round)
Ino: chain (from Greek ἴς [genitive: ἰνός inos], fibre)
Phyllo: sheet (from Greek φύλλον phyllon, leaf)
Tekto: three-dimensional framework (from Greek stem τεκτ- tekt- in words having to do with carpentry)
Nickel–Strunz code scheme: NN.XY.##x
NN: Nickel–Strunz mineral class number
X: Nickel–Strunz mineral division letter
Y: Nickel–Strunz mineral family letter
##x: Nickel–Strunz mineral/group number, x add-on letter

Class: sulfosalts 
 02.G Sulfarsenites, sulfantimonites, sulfobismuthites
 02.G: IMA2007-010
 02.GA Neso-sulfarsenites, etc., without additional S: 05 Proustite, 05 Pyrargyrite; 10 Xanthoconite, 10 Pyrostilpnite; 15 Samsonite; 20 Wittichenite, 20 Skinnerite, 25 Malyshevite, 25 Lisiguangite, 25 Muckeite, 25 Lapieite; 30 Aktashite, 30 Nowackiite, 30 Gruzdevite; 35 Laffittite; 40 Stalderite, 40 Routhierite; 45 Erniggliite; 50 Seligmannite, 50 Soucekite, 50 Bournonite
 02.GB Neso-sulfarsenites, etc.: 05 Argentotennantite, 05 Giraudite, 05 Goldfieldite, 05 Freibergite, 05 Hakite, 05 Tennantite, 05 Tetrahedrite; 10 Selenostephanite, 10 Stephanite; 15 Cupropearceite, 15 Selenopolybasite, 15 Cupropolybasite, 15 Polybasite, 15 Pearceite, 15 Antimonpearceite, 15 Arsenpolybasite, 20 Galkhaite
 02.GC Poly-sulfarsenites: 05 Hatchite, 05 Wallisite; 10 Sinnerite, 15 Watanabeite, 20 Simonite, 25 Q­ratite, 30 Smithite, 35 Trechmannite, 40a Aleksite, 40b Kochkarite, 40c Rucklidgeite, 40c Poubaite, 40d Saddlebackite, 40e Babkinite; 45 Tvalchrelidzeite, 50 Mutnovskite
 02.H Sulfosalts of SnS Archetype
 02.HA With Cu, Ag, Fe (without Pb): 05 Emplectite, 05 Chalcostibite; 10 Miargyrite, 15 Livingstonite; 20 Berthierite, 20 Clerite, 20 Garavellite; 25 Baumstarkite, 25 Aramayoite
 02.HB With Cu, Ag, Hg, Fe, Sn and Pb: 05a Krupkaite, 05a Aikinite, 05a Hammarite, 05a Gladite, 05a Friedrichite, 05a Lindstromite, 05a Pekoite, 05a Paarite, 05a Emilite, 05a Salzburgite, 05b Meneghinite, 05c Jaskolskiite; 10a Kobellite, 10a Tintinaite, 10b Giessenite, 10b Izoklakeite, 10c Eclarite; 15 Jamesonite, 15 Benavidesite; 20a Nagyagite, 20b Buckhornite, 20c Museumite, 20d Berryite, 20e Watkinsonite
 02.HC With only Pb: 05a Sartorite, 05a Twinnite, 05a Guettardite, 05b Baumhauerite, 05b Baumhauerite-2a, 05c Liveingite, 05d Dufrenoysite, 05d Veenite, 05d Rathite, 05e Chabourneite, 05f Pierrotite, 05f Parapierrotite, 05g Marumoite; 10a Fuloppite, 10b Bismutoplagionite*, 10b Plagionite, 10c Heteromorphite, 10d Semseyite, 10d Rayite; 15 Boulangerite, 15 Falkmanite, 15 Plumosite*; 20 Robinsonite, 25 Moeloite, 30 Dadsonite, 35 Zoubekite, 35 Owyheeite
 02.HD With Tl: 05 Lorandite, 05 Weissbergite; 15 Christite, 20 Jankovicite, 25 Rebulite, 30 Imhofite, 35 Edenharterite, 40 Jentschite, 45 Hutchinsonite, 50 Bernardite, 55 Sicherite, 60 Gabrielite
 02.HE With alkalies, : 05 Gerstleyite
 02.HF With SnS and PbS archetype structure units: 20 Vrbaite; 25a Abramovite, 25a Levyclaudite, 25a Cylindrite, 25b Coiraite, 25b Incaite, 25b Potosiite, 25b Franckeite; 30 Lengenbachite
 02.J Sulfosalts of PbS Archetype
 02.JA Galena derivatives with little or no Pb: 05a IMA2005-036, 05a IMA2008-058, 05a Cupropavonite, 05a Pavonite, 05b Grumiplucite, 05c Kudriavite, 05d Cupromakovickyite, 05d Makovickyite, 05e Benjaminite, 05f Mummeite, 05g Borodaevite, 05h Mozgovaite; 10a Cuprobismutite, 10b Kupcikite, 10c Hodrushite, 10d Pizgrischite, 10e Paderaite; 15 Cuboargyrite, 15 Schapbachite; 20 Bohdanowiczite, 20 Matildite, 20 Volynskite
 02.JB Galena derivatives, with Pb: 05 Diaphorite, 10 Cosalite; 15 Marrite, 15 Freieslebenite; 20 Cannizzarite, 20 Wittite; 25a Junoite, 25b Felbertalite, 25c Nordstromite, 25d Proudite, 25g Nuffieldite, 25i IMA2008-053, 25i Neyite, 25j Rouxelite; 30a Jordanite, 30a Geocronite, 30b Kirkiite, 30c Tsugaruite; 35a Zinkenite, 35b Scainiite, 35c Pillaite, 35d Pellouxite; 40a Bursaite?, 40a Gustavite, 40a Lillianite, 40a Xilingolite, 40a Treasurite, 40a Vikingite, 40a Fizelyite, 40a Andorite, 40a Roshchinite, 40a Uchucchacuaite, 40a Ramdohrite, 40b Aschamalmite, 40b Eskimoite, 40b Heyrovskyite, 40c Ourayite, 40d Schirmerite, 40e Ustarasite; 45 Angelaite, 45 Galenobismutite, 45 Weibullite; 55 Gratonite, 60 Marrucciite, 65 Vurroite
 02.JC Galena derivatives, with Tl: 05 Ellisite, 10 Gillulyite
 02.K Sulfarsenates, Sulfantimonates
 02.KA Sulfarsenates with  tetrahedra: 05 Enargite, 05 Stibioenargite*, 05 Petrukite; 10 Briartite, 10 Famatinite, 10 Luzonite, 10 Permingeatite, 10 Barquillite; 15 Fangite
 02.KB Sulfarsenates with additional S: 05 Billingsleyite
 02.L Unclassified Sulfosalts
 02.LA Without essential Pb: 10 Dervillite, 15 Daomanite*, 20 Vaughanite, 25 Criddleite, 30 Fettelite, 35 Chameanite, 40 Arcubisite, 45 Mgriite, 50 Benleonardite, 55 Tsnigriite, 60 Borovskite, 65 Jonassonite
 02.LB With essential Pb: 05 Miharaite, 20 Ardaite, 30 Madocite, 35 Larosite; 40 Petrovicite, 40 Mazzettiite; 45 Crerarite, 50 Launayite, 55 Playfairite, 60 Sorbyite, 65 Sterryite
 02.M
 02.MA Oxysulfosalts of Alkalies and Alkali Earths: 05 Ottensite, 05 Cetineite; 10 Sarabauite
 02.X Unclassified Strunz Sulfosalts
 02.XX Unknown: 00 Tazieffite, 00 Horobetsuite*, 00 Kitaibelite?, 00 Parajamesonite?, 00 Sakharovaite?, 00 Volfsonite*

Synthetic sulfosalts
Many sulfosalts can be prepared in the laboratory, including many that do not occur in nature.

References

 Mozgova N.N. (2000). Sulfosalt mineralogy today. In: Modern Approaches to Ore and Environmental Mineralogy, MSF Mini-Symposium Espoo Finland, June 11–17, 2000, https://web.archive.org/web/20050907172937/http://www.igem.ru/igem/mine/sulfosalts.htm Retrieved July 22, 2005.